Migdal Ohr (lit. Tower of Light) is one of Israel's largest NGO's. The main and additional two residential campuses along with 160 youth clubs provide educational frameworks and social guidance for over 10,000 children and teenagers from underprivileged and dysfunctional homes across Israel every day. Migdal Ohr also runs community social programs, adult education programs, prisoner rehabilitation programs and soup kitchens that prepare 15,000 meals a day.

Migdal Ohr has three residential campuses and 160 youth clubs.

Migdal Ohr was founded by Israel Prize laureate Rabbi Yitzchak Dovid Grossman in 1972. The school began with 18 students. Since then, over 15,000 youngsters have graduated from the Migdal Ohr, an institution that  provides needy and immigrant children with housing, schooling, medical and dental care, clothing,  libraries, after school enrichment courses and vocational training.

See also
 Education in Israel
 Youth village

References

External links 
 Migdal Ohr Official website
 

Youth villages in Israel
Education in Israel